An ophthalmic medical practitioner (OMP) is a medical practitioner.  In the UK they are registered with a qualification in ophthalmology who is employed to carry out medical eye examinations and prescribe glasses, contact lenses, eyepatches and other orthoptic treatment. In order to work as an ophthalmic medical practitioner a doctor must be on the Central List of the Ophthalmic Qualifications Committee at the Royal College of Ophthalmologists. This is a statutory list that is administered by the British Medical Association. OMPs are often trainee ophthalmologists who work to supplement their income.

"MPs are ophthalmologists who undertake NHS sight tests under the General Ophthalmic Services contract. Like optometrists, they examine eyes, test sight, diagnose abnormalities and prescribe suitable corrective lenses. OMPs are registered with and regulated by the General Medical Council. There are currently around 400 registered ophthalmic medical practitioners in the UK. 

"The responsibilities of OMPs in conducting NHS sight tests are the same as those of optometrists and both have an important role in the primary detection of eye disease. In the course of sight testing, symptoms and signs of eye disease may become evident and the OMP has the additional role of taking a history, conducting an ophthalmic examination as appropriate, and referring patients for further investigation and treatment where indicated.

Some OMPs also work in the Hospital Eye Service or as General Practitioners or in other health care settings."

See also
Community ophthalmic physician
Eye care professional

Links
The Royal College of Ophthalmologists - Ophthalmic Medical Practitioners

References

Ophthalmology
Health care occupations